Luca Argentero (born 12 April 1978) is an Italian actor, model and television personality. He has appeared in more than 18 films since 2006.

Biography
Born in Turin to Guido and Agata, Argentero grew up in neighboring Moncalieri. After completing high school at the Catholic "Collegio San Giuseppe", he worked as a bartender in a local nightclub while earning a degree in Economy & Commerce in 2004. Argentero rose to fame in 2003 as a participant in the third season of the popular reality TV series Grande Fratello (Big Brother), arriving to the final and earning third place, with 9% of the Italian votes. After this experience, Argentero began guest appearing on a variety of television shows and worked as a model, posing for a sensual calendar made by the Italian monthly magazine Max.

In 2005, Argentero made his debut as an actor in the television series Carabinieri, in which he portrayed the character of Marco Tosi in the fourth, fifth, and sixth seasons. In 2006, he played the main character in the short film Il Quarto Sesso (The Fourth Sex). That same year, Argentero also made his cinematic debut in A Casa Nostra (Our Country), directed by Francesca Comencini. In 2007, he was in Saturno Contro (Saturn in Opposition), a film by Ferzan Özpetek, playing the role of a homosexual man. The same year, Argentero also appeared in Lezioni di Cioccolato, a film by Claudio Cupellini. In addition, he appeared on television as one of the two main characters in the miniseries La Baronessa di Carini.

In 2008, Argentero took the role of the protagonist in the film Solo un padre, directed by Luca Lucini. Production on this movie began in January 2008 in Argentero's hometown of Turin. In 2009 he was in Diverso da Chi? (Different from Whom?), in which he again portrayed a gay man. This role earned Argentero his first David di Donatello nomination as best actor.

Filmography

External links 
 

Italian male film actors
1978 births
Living people
Actors from Turin